Noel Horsfield (22 December 1913 – 13 February 1988) was a South African sailor. He competed at the 1952 Summer Olympics and the 1956 Summer Olympics.

References

External links
 

1913 births
1988 deaths
South African male sailors (sport)
Olympic sailors of South Africa
Sailors at the 1952 Summer Olympics – 5.5 Metre
Sailors at the 1956 Summer Olympics – 5.5 Metre
Place of birth missing